Sir John Osbaldiston Field  (30 October 1913 – 1985) was a British colonial administrator who was the last Resident Commissioner of the Gilbert and Ellice Islands from 9 January 1970 and then, from 1 January 1972, the first Governor of this Crown Colony.

Field was one of three children of Frank Osbaldiston Field of Gosport, Hampshire and Gertrude Caroline Perrin of Natal, South Africa. He was educated at Stellenbosch Boys School in South Africa and Magdalene College, Cambridge.

From 1963 to 1969, he also was the British Governor of Saint Helena. He was before the Commissioner of the British Cameroons (United Nations trust territory) before incorporation.

References

Governors of the Gilbert and Ellice Islands
Colonial Administrative Service officers
People from former British colonies and protectorates in Oceania
1913 births
1985 deaths
Alumni of Magdalene College, Cambridge
British colonial people in Cameroon